Vote-ratio monotonicity (VRM) is a property of apportionment methods, which are methods of allocating seats in a parliament among political parties. The property says that, if the ratio between the number of votes won by party A to the number of votes won by party B increases, then it should NOT happen that party A loses a seat while party B gains a seat.

The property was first presented in the context of apportionment of seats in a parliament among federal states. In this context, it is called population monotonicity or population-pair monotonicity. The property says that, if the population of state A increases faster than that of state B, then state A should not lose a seat while state B gains a seat. An apportionment method that fails to satisfy this property is said to have a population paradox.  Note the term "population monotonicity" is more commonly used to denote a very different property of resource-allocation rules; see population monotonicity. Therefore, we prefer to use here the term "vote-ratio monotonicity", which is unambiguous.

Definitions 
For example, it can be an integer representing the number of seats in a house of representatives. The resource should be allocated between some  agents, such as states or parties. The agents have different entitlements, denoted by a vector . For example, ti can be the fraction of votes won by party i. An allocation rule is a rule that, for any  and entitlement vector , returns an allocation vector .  

An allocation rule M is called vote-ratio monotone if the following holds:

The original definition of population monotonicity by Balinski and Young has an additional condition: 

Population paradox 
Some of the earlier Congressional apportionment methods, such as Hamilton's, did not satisfy VRM, and thus could exhibit the population paradox. For example, after the 1900 census, Virginia lost a seat to Maine, even though Virginia's population was growing more rapidly. See here  for a simple numeric example of a this paradox.

Relation to other properties 
Balinski and Young proved the following theorems (note that they call the VRM property "population monotonicity"):

 If , then a partial apportionment method is VRM if-and-only-if it is a partial divisor method.
 An apportionment method is VRM if-and-only-if it is a divisor method.

Palomares, Pukelsheim and Ramirez prove the following theorem:

 Every apportionment rule that is anonymous, balanced, concordant, decent and coherent is vote-ratio monotone.

Vote-ratio monotonicity implies that, if population moves from state  to state  while the populations of other states do not change, then both  and  must hold.

See also 

 Apportionment paradox
 Seats-to-votes ratio

References 

Apportionment method criteria